Antoine de Seguiran, called chevalier de Seguiran, was an 18th-century French soldier and encyclopédiste. De Seguiran was from a military family from Arles. In October 1766, he married Pauline Le Breton, a former fiancée to Beaumarchais.

Chevalier de Seguiran wrote two articles for the Encyclopédie by Diderot and D'Alembert: Vérité (truth) and Vertu. Diderot added the sensualist point of view on the latter.

Bibliography 
 Frank Arthur Kafker, The Encyclopedists as individuals: a biographical dictionary of the authors of the Encyclopédie, Oxford, Studies on Voltaire and the eighteenth Century, 1988, (p. 359). 
 Charles, Sébastien: Berkeley Au Siècle Des Lumières: Immatérialisme Et Scepticisme Au XVIIIe Siècle. Bibliothèque D'Histoire De La Philosophie. Librairie Philosophique J. Vrin (2003)  S.155

External links 
 Antoine de Seguiran on Wikisource
 Antoine de Seguiran on Persée

18th-century French military personnel
Contributors to the Encyclopédie (1751–1772)
People from Arles
18th-century births
18th-century deaths